Erik Arckens (born 9 December 1961) is a Belgian politician who was a member of the Vlaams Belang.

Life
Arckens occupation was university assistant.

He was member in the Parliament of the Brussels-Capital Region for the Vlaams Blok from 1999 till 2004 and since 2000 he has been a councillor of Brussels. From 2004 till 2014 he was also a member of the Flemish Parliament.

In July 2011, he left Vlaams Belang because he no longer felt at home in the party. Since then he has resided as an independent in the Flemish Parliament.

References

Vlaams Belang politicians
1961 births
Living people
21st-century Belgian politicians